Madgoul, also known as Madgul, is a town in the northern of Tadjoura Region. It is situated about 95 kilometres (59 miles) north of Tadjoura and 14 km (8 mi) east of the border with Ethiopia.

Climate
Madgoul has a hot desert climate (BWh) in Köppen-Geiger system.

References
Geographic.org: Madgoul, Djibouti

Populated places in Djibouti
Tadjourah Region